Kim Myeong-hyeon (born 29 December 1948) is former Administrator of National Emergency Management Agency of the Ministry of Public Administration and Security. He was also Chairman of Korea Fire Safety Association, where he is currently serving as senior advisor.

Experiences
1991 - Commissioner, Seongnam Fire Department (Gyeonggi)
1997 - Commissioner, Incheon Fire & Safety Management Department
1999 - Commissioner, Busan Fire Department
2001~2003 - Administrator, National Emergency Management Agency, Ministry of Public Administration and Security
2004~2007 - Chairman, Korea Fire Safety Association
2007~ - Senior Advisor, Korea Fire Safety Association

Awards
Presidential Award(1987)
Green Stripes Order of Service Merit(1993)

References

《소방학개론》(청문각, 2007)  == Books == * "Introduction to Fire Protection Studies" (cheongmungak, 2007) 

1948 births
Living people
South Korean civil servants

ko:김명현